Stade Larbi Zaouli is a multi-use stadium in Casablanca, Morocco.  It is used mostly for football matches and TAS de Casablanca are the current tenants. The stadium has a capacity of 30,000 people after being renovated in 2019.

Weblinks 
Groundhopping Links: Homegame-Impressions of the Stade Larbi-Zaouli

Larbi Zaouli
Sports venues in Casablanca